Pteremis is a genus of flies belonging to the family Lesser Dung flies.

Species
P. canaria (Papp, 1977)
P. fenestralis (Fallén, 1820)
P. kaszabi (Papp, 1973)
P. mongolica (Papp, 1973)
P. unica (Spuler, 1924)
P. wirthi (Marshall, 1984)

References

Sphaeroceridae
Sphaeroceroidea genera
Diptera of North America
Muscomorph flies of Europe
Diptera of Asia
Taxa named by Camillo Rondani